Bachelors Walk was an Irish (RTÉ) comedy-drama series shot in and around Dublin. The programme was first broadcast on Network 2 on 1 October 2001. After a run of three series and an absence for three years, a one-off Christmas special which aired on St. Stephen's Day 2006 on RTÉ Two.

Plot
The series revolves around Barry, who is looking for a get-rich-quick scheme; Raymond, a film critic; and Michael, a barrister, who live in a house in Bachelors Walk in Dublin.

Cast
 Keith McErlean as Barry
 Don Wycherley as Raymond
 Simon Delaney as Michael
Marcella Plunkett as Alison
Kelly Campbell as Jane
Donna Dent as Constance
Nick Lee as James Lester
Moya Farrelly as Sally
Antony Conaty as Estate Agent
Barbara Griffin as Jane
Ailish Symons as Jennifer
Vincent Walsh as Davor
Des Nealon as Michael's Father
Annie Ryan as Kate
Fiona Glascott as Rachel
Aidan Kelly as Dean Jordan
Oliver Maguire as Russell

Production
The first series was filmed during the summer of 2000. Most of the series was filmed on location in Dublin, the house where the series is set is on Lower Ormond Quay, west of the Millennium Bridge. The pub featured throughput the series is Mulligan's pub on Poolbeg Street. The second series was filmed during the summer of 2002.

Episodes

Season 1 (2001)

Season 2 (2002)

Season 3 (2003)

Christmas Special (2006)

Release
Only the first series has been released on DVD; music rights issues have prevented the release of seasons 2 and 3.

References

External links

2001 Irish television series debuts
2006 Irish television series endings
Irish comedy-drama television series
RTÉ original programming
Television shows set in Dublin (city)